The Ministry of Health of the Russian Federation (in short ) is a ministry of the Government of Russia responsible for health care and public health.

The Ministry of Health oversees the legal regulation and state policies of health in Russia, including pharmaceuticals, the public health care system, health insurance, medical rehabilitation, sanitation, disease prevention, and the circulation of medicines. It is headquartered in Tverskoy District, Moscow.

The Ministry of Health was formed in 2012 from the Ministry of Health and Social Development which was split in two under Prime Minister Dmitry Medvedev, with the social security departments forming the Ministry of Labour and Social Affairs.

Mikhail Murashko has been Minister of Health since 21 January 2020.

Health ministers of Russia

Duties
Its main official responsibilities include:
 developing and implementing state policy in healthcare;
 developing and implementing federal health programs, including initiatives on
diabetes, tuberculosis, health promotion, health education, disease prevention etc.;
 developing draft legislation and presenting it to the State Duma;
 governance of federal medical facilities;
 medical education and manpower development;
 epidemiological and environmental health monitoring and health statistics;
 control of infectious diseases;
 development of health regulations;
 development of federal standards and recommendations for quality assurance;
 development and implementation of federal health programs
 control and licensing of drugs.

References

External links

  

Health
Russia